The Korfball Federation of Armenia (KFA), is the regulating body of korfball in Armenia, governed by the Armenian Olympic Committee. The headquarters of the federation is located in Yerevan.

History 
The Korfball Federation of Armenia was established in 1991 and is currently led by President Vardan Shahumyan. The Federation oversees the training of korfball athletes and is responsible for the development of korfball in the country. The Federation organizes Armenia's participation in European and international korfball competitions, including in the IKF World Korfball Championships. The Federation is a full member of the International Korfball Federation.

Activities 
The Federation manages the Armenia national korfball team and the Armenian national beach korfball team.

The Armenia national korfball team participated in the 2016 International Korfball Tournament in the Netherlands.

On 28 August 2021, the Armenian national beach korfball team participated in the International Beach Korfball tournament in The Hague, the Netherlands.

See also 
 List of national korfball associations
 Sport in Armenia

References

External links 
 Korfball Federation of Armenia on Facebook

Sports governing bodies in Armenia
Sports organizations established in 2018
Korfball governing bodies
Korfball in Europe